Meramera (Melamela) is an Austronesian language of New Britain in Papua New Guinea.

Name
The name Meramera comes from the closely related Nakanai language in the Bileki dialect.

References

Meso-Melanesian languages
Languages of East New Britain Province
Languages of West New Britain Province